Niall John Quinn (honorary MBE; born 6 October 1966) is an Irish former professional footballer, manager, businessman and sports television pundit.

As a player he was a striker who played top flight football for Arsenal, Manchester City and Sunderland, with spells in the Premier League for both City and the Black Cats. Quinn also received 92 caps for the Republic of Ireland national football team, scoring 21 times, which makes him Ireland's second highest goalscorer of all time. He also appeared with the Irish team at the UEFA European Football Championship of 1988 and two FIFA World Cups in 1990 and 2002.

He later was part of a consortium to buy Sunderland and became the club's chairman. He also had a spell as manager before stepping down to a role of club director. He left the club in February 2012 and has since worked as a pundit namely on Sky Sports.

Playing career

Gaelic games
Niall Quinn played Gaelic football for the Perrystown, Dublin 12, club Robert Emmets. He also played underage football and hurling for Dublin. In July 1983, Quinn captained a Dublin Colleges GAA party on a one-month tour of Australia.

Aged 16, he played in the 1983 All-Ireland Minor Hurling Championship Final, and was offered a contract to play professional Australian rules football before settling on a career in football. He played Gaelic football for Co. Kildare club Eadestown after his retirement, winning a junior C county title in 2008.

Club career

Arsenal
He played as a youth for Irish club Manortown United and then Lourdes Celtic in Crumlin, Dublin 12. After an unsuccessful trial at Fulham he signed professional forms with English club Arsenal in 1983. He was signed as a centre-forward, but also had a brief spell as a centre-half for the Arsenal third team. After scoring 18 goals in 18 reserve matches in the first half of the 1985–86 season, Quinn was included in the first-team squad for a match against Liverpool. Quinn scored in the match as Arsenal recorded a 2–0 win. He made a further 11 league appearances for Arsenal that season, but failed to score as they finished seventh in the league. The end of the season brought Quinn his first call-up to the Republic of Ireland national team.

Quinn found himself playing under a new manager for the following season, as George Graham was appointed in place of Don Howe. Quinn had a regular place in the side that season, appearing in 35 league games and scoring eight goals. He also collected a Football League Cup winner's medal as Arsenal triumphed 2–1 over Liverpool. However, after Arsenal signed another target man, Alan Smith, in the 1987 close season, Quinn struggled to get into the team. Over the next three seasons he managed a total of just 20 league appearances and five goals – his three appearances in 1988–89 not being enough for a title medal. Quinn's lack of opportunities led him to submit a written transfer request at the start of the 1989–90 season. In total he scored 20 goals in 94 appearances for Arsenal, of which 81 were starts.

Manchester City
Manchester City manager Howard Kendall signed Quinn for £800,000 in March 1990, shortly before the transfer deadline. He marked his debut with a goal, in a 1–1 draw against Chelsea at Maine Road. He scored 22 times in his first full season, and he went on to spend six years at the club, scoring 78 goals in 245 appearances; his time at City was hampered by a cruciate ligament injury in 1993–94. Although he returned to the side the following season, he managed just eight goals from 35 games.

His most notable game for City was 20 April 1991 when he scored early on and saved a penalty as City beat Derby County 2–1, relegating Derby in the process. City goalkeeper Tony Coton had been sent off before half time for fouling Dean Saunders to concede the penalty. At this time teams rarely named goalkeepers as substitutes, so Quinn replaced Coton in goal. Other notable games included the Manchester derby on 7 November 1993, in which he scored twice in the first half to put City 2–0 up against United by half time, although a remarkable United comeback saw City lose 3–2.

In the 1993 close season, Everton made a bid to sign Quinn and a further bid was made early in the 1993–94 season, but both bids were rejected and Quinn remained at Maine Road for a further three seasons. A cruciate ligament injury sustained in a match against Sheffield Wednesday in November 1993 caused Quinn to miss the majority of the 1993–94 season, and prevented him from playing in the 1994 FIFA World Cup. He returned at the start of the 1994–95 season, but the partnership forged by Uwe Rösler and Paul Walsh in his absence meant he was not always a starter. In attempt to reduce the wage bill, Manchester City tried to sell Quinn in the 1995 close-season, but a proposed move to Lisbon club Sporting fell through after failure to agree contractual terms.

He managed a total of 193 league appearances in over six years at Maine Road, and scored a total of 64 goals for them.

Sunderland

Quinn finished his career with a highly successful spell at Sunderland, joining the north-east club in August 1996 for a club record £1.3 million, although he missed six months of his first season due to a knee injury – similar to the one which ruined his World Cup chances three years earlier. Before his injury, he had got off to a fine start to his Sunderland career, finding the net twice on his debut in a 4–1 win at Nottingham Forest. In his absence from September to March, Sunderland struggled and although he was back in action by the end of the season, they were relegated.

His partnership with striker Kevin Phillips, signed in the 1997 close season, was one of the most prolific in the Football League in the late 1990s/early 2000s (a combined 194 goals for both players in all competitions from 1997-98 to 2002-03) and helped the club to regain promotion to the Premiership for the 1999–2000 season. In March 1999 Quinn again had to play in goal, this time replacing the injured Thomas Sørensen in a game against Bradford City. In similar circumstances to when playing for Manchester City against Derby County in 1991 Quinn scored and then went in goal, and kept a clean sheet to help his side win. He also has the distinction of being the first player to score at Sunderland's Stadium of Light, against Manchester City in 1997. He became a local legend at Sunderland, winning both the Sunderland and North East Sportswriters' Player of the Year awards in 1999 after scoring 21 goals in Sunderland's record-breaking Division One title-winning season. His final appearance for Sunderland came on 19 October 2002 against West Ham.

In a league career lasting 17 years, he had played a total of 475 times in the Premier League and Football League, scoring 141 goals.

International career
Quinn played in the qualifiers for the 1986 UEFA European Under-18 Football Championship, and made his Irish international debut at under-17 level against Northern Ireland at Seaview in a 6–1 friendly win in January 1985, the first ever fixture between the two nations. Quinn scored a hat trick as did Eamonn Dolan. However Arsenal refused permission for Quinn to travel to the 1985 FIFA World Youth Championships.

Quinn made his senior debut as a substitute against the host nation in the Iceland Triangular Tournament in 1986. Quinn played for his country at two World Cups, in 1990 and 2002; he missed the 1994 FIFA World Cup because of injury.		
Quinn was also a member of the Irish squad that participated in the 1988 European Championship playing just once, as a substitute in the Republic of Ireland's 1–0 win over England in Stuttgart.

Quinn scored the equaliser against the Netherlands in the 1990 FIFA World Cup which allowed the Republic to progress to the second round of that tournament. In the qualifiers for the 2002 FIFA World Cup, he scored against Cyprus on his 35th birthday to break the all-time goalscoring record, then held by Frank Stapleton. In the tournament proper, his header set up Robbie Keane's late equaliser against Germany, which was the only goal Germany conceded before the final. In the second-round, with the Republic behind 1–0 to Spain, it was a foul on Quinn that led to Ireland's last-minute penalty, converted by Robbie Keane, which tied the game and brought extra-time, but the Republic lost 3–2 in the resulting penalty shootout.

After the tournament, he announced his retirement from international football, amassing 92 caps. At the time, he was his country's all-time top scorer with 21 goals; this record was later surpassed by Robbie Keane in October 2004.

Quinn had a testimonial match between Sunderland and the Republic of Ireland in 2002. He donated the entire proceeds to charity, an act for which he received a number of awards, including an honorary MBE. Instead of receiving an appearance fee for the game, all the players received a letter from a sick child. Quinn played for both teams during the match, which raised over £1 million. The Republic of Ireland won the match 3–0.

Post-playing career

Quinn retired in 2003 at the age of 37, taking a brief coaching role at Sunderland. Quinn has also made appearances as a television pundit and commentator for televised matches involving his former teams with Sky Sports. He made a single league appearance for Thai Premier League side BEC Tero Sasana in March 2006 to promote the league and the side's link with Arsenal.

Quinn released an acclaimed autobiography Niall Quinn – The Autobiography (2002), which was ghostwritten by Tom Humphries. It won the Best Autobiography category in the inaugural British Sports Book Awards. It was also nominated for a William Hill Sports Book of the Year award. The book is not structured chronologically, but rather in the context of Quinn's career swansong, the 2002 World Cup in South Korea and Japan.

Heading the Drumaville Consortium of wealthy Irish businessmen, in June 2006, Quinn successfully brokered a deal to buy a controlling stake in Sunderland. In July 2006 Quinn became the chairman and manager of Sunderland. The deal was finalised on 27 July 2006, with sufficient shares being sold to the consortium in order for them to take complete control.

His managerial career did not get off to a good start as the team lost its first four league games in a row. On 22 August, Sunderland played Bury away in the League Cup where they lost 2–0. After the match Quinn said that a new manager would be appointed by Sunderland's next game. Quinn stepped to one side (to continue in his role as Sunderland chairman) paving the way for Roy Keane to take charge. This was highly unexpected considering the huge rift between the two arising from Keane's infamous ejection from the 2002 World Cup. Keane was appointed manager of the club on 28 August 2006. The appointment matured into a great success, with Sunderland clinching an immediate Premier League comeback as Football League Championship champions. Quinn made substantial amounts of money available for buying new players, as he had a declared ambition to establish Sunderland as a top club. 

In 2008, he received the James Joyce Award of the Literary & Historical Society in University College Dublin.

In 2010, Quinn was named a patron of the Sir Bobby Robson Foundation.

In October 2011 Ellis Short replaced Quinn as chairman of Sunderland. Quinn was appointed as Director of International Development on behalf of the club and remained in this role until stepping down in February 2012 and after six years involved with the running of the club saying "Everything is in place for Sunderland to really make a statement, which was always my aim".

Since leaving Sunderland, Quinn is now chairman of a satellite broadband company in Ireland called Q Sat.

In 2012, Quinn started commentating for Sky Sports and normally commentates alongside Martin Tyler.
He won, also in 2012, the North East Football Writers' Association's Personality of the Year for 2011. In November 2013, Quinn was bestowed with the Freedom of Sunderland award by the city of Sunderland.

In January 2020, Quinn was appointed as interim deputy chief executive officer of the Football Association of Ireland, choosing to go without salary until the financial future of the organisation could be secured. In September 2020 he stepped down from his interim CEO role.

Fan relationships
Quinn has his own song titled "Niall Quinn's Disco Pants". The song was originally created by Manchester City supporters during a night out on a pre-season tour in Penola, Italy, in 1992. There had been a bust-up with City team-mate Steve McMahon and Quinn had removed his torn and bloodied shirt and was dancing with Rick Holden wearing just a pair of cut-off jeans. He was "hardly aware" that there were a group of hardcore City fans watching and they treated him to "the first performance of the song that will follow me till the end of my career."

The song was adopted by Sunderland fans and released as a single by the club's dedicated fanzine A Love Supreme. It reached no. 56 in the UK Singles Chart in April 1999.

Quinn has received praise for his relationship with Sunderland fans. This was highlighted in March 2007 when, during his tenure as chairman, Quinn paid over £8,000 out of club funds to allow around 80 Sunderland fans to travel home by taxi when stranded at Bristol airport after being ejected from their scheduled flight home. The incident happened on Saturday night when Quinn, Sunderland staff and a group of supporters boarded an easyJet flight from Bristol to Newcastle, following Sunderland's 1–0 win at Championship promotion rivals Cardiff. After spotting Quinn, many of the fans broke into song, serenading Quinn with 'Niall Quinn's Disco Pants'. 

The EasyJet pilot alleged that a number of supporters were drunk and they were ejected from the plane. Quinn, outraged at the fans' treatment, also left the plane and commandeered a fleet of taxis and minivans to return the fans home.

Personal life
Both Quinn's parents are from Thurles, County Tipperary. His father as well as his uncles on his mother's side played hurling for Tipperary. He was born in Dublin. He now lives in Kildare. He has been married to the Irish model Gillian Roe since 1992, and they have two children: Aisling and Michael.

In 2005 Quinn was banned for driving for three months and ordered to pay a €200 fine after admitting drink-driving.

Career statistics

Club

International
Scores and results list Ireland's goal tally first, score column indicates score after each Quinn goal.

Managerial record

Honours
Arsenal
Football League Cup: 1986–87

Sunderland
Football League First Division: 1998–99

Individual
 Irish Young Player of the Year: 1990
 Manchester City Player of the Year: 1991
PFA Team of the Year: 1998–99 First Division
 Sunderland Player of the Year: 1999
 North East Football Writers' Player of 1999
 Beacon Fellowship Prize for his contribution to medical and children's charities, 2003
PFA Merit Award: 2002
North East Football Writers' Association's Personality of the Year: 2011
Freedom of Sunderland award: 2013

See also
 List of outfield association footballers who played in goal
 List of players who have converted from one football code to another

References

External links

 
 
 The Niall Quinn Living Tribute Site
 Niall Quinn articles for The Guardian
 Fan site

1966 births
Living people
Association football forwards
Association footballers from Dublin (city)
Arsenal F.C. players
Manchester City F.C. players
Sunderland A.F.C. players
Niall Quinn
Premier League players
English Football League players
Niall Quinn
1990 FIFA World Cup players
2002 FIFA World Cup players
UEFA Euro 1988 players
Businesspeople from County Dublin
Dual players
Dublin Gaelic footballers 
Dublin hurlers 
Eadestown Gaelic footballers
English Football Hall of Fame inductees
Gaelic footballers who switched code
Irish expatriate sportspeople in England
Irish expatriate sportspeople in Thailand
Members of the Order of the British Empire
Outfield association footballers who played in goal
People educated at Drimnagh Castle Secondary School
Republic of Ireland association footballers
Republic of Ireland football chairmen and investors
Republic of Ireland international footballers
Republic of Ireland B international footballers
Republic of Ireland under-21 international footballers
Republic of Ireland under-23 international footballers
Republic of Ireland youth international footballers
Republic of Ireland football managers
Republic of Ireland expatriate football managers
Robert Emmets Gaelic footballers
Robert Emmets hurlers
Sunderland A.F.C. directors and chairmen
Sunderland A.F.C. managers